Enes Sağlık (born 8 July 1991) is a Belgian footballer who plays for Turkish club Adanaspor as a midfielder.

Club career
On 1 September 2021, he signed with Menemenspor in Turkey for one year with an optional second.

Career statistics

Club

References

External links
 
 
 Profile & stats - Lokeren
 

1991 births
People from Verviers
Belgian people of Turkish descent
Footballers from Liège Province
Living people
Association football midfielders
Belgian footballers
Belgium youth international footballers
Belgium under-21 international footballers
K.A.S. Eupen players
K.S.C. Lokeren Oost-Vlaanderen players
R. Charleroi S.C. players
A.F.C. Tubize players
Royal Excel Mouscron players
Menemenspor footballers
Adanaspor footballers
Belgian Pro League players
Challenger Pro League players
TFF First League players
Belgian expatriate footballers
Expatriate footballers in Turkey
Belgian expatriate sportspeople in Turkey